Parota redirects to Enterolobium cyclocarpum, a species of flowering tree in the pea family

Parota may also refer to:
 Parota, Birbhum, a census town in West Bengal, India
 Parotta, South Indian food